Devilsmother is a  mountain in Connemara, Ireland.

Geography 
Devilsmother is in the Partry Mountains, at the head of Killary Harbour, overlooking the Western Way long-distance path. It sits on the border between County Galway (to the south) and County Mayo (to the north).

Etymology 
The mountain has two Irish language names: Magairlí an Deamhain (meaning "the demon's testicles") and Binn Gharbh (meaning "rough peak"). The anglicized spellings Mogarlyandoon and Ben Garrif appear on some historical maps. Originally, it seems that Magairlí an Deamhain was the name of a knobbly ridge north of the summit, while Binn Gharbh applied to the mountain as a whole. The English name Devilsmother may be "a euphemistic false translation" or may be based on an alternative name.

References

Mountains and hills of County Galway
Mountains and hills of County Mayo
Hewitts of Ireland
Marilyns of Ireland
Mountains under 1000 metres